Harare North is a novel by the Zimbabwean author Brian Chikwava, winner of the Caine Prize in 2004. The novel was published by Jonathan Cape in 2009. A French translation was published by Editions Zoe in 2011.

Explanation of the novel's title
After a decade of emigration, Zimbabweans now refer to London as Harare North. The novel being political, the title alludes to
a relocation of power from Zimbabwe's capital, Harare, along with the exodus of Zimbabweans
the 'colonisation' of London by Zimbabweans

Plot summary
The story is set in London. The nameless narrator of the story is a former militia who got caught up in the in-fighting between the Zimbabwean police and the Green Bombers, the notorious militia, and has to flee Zimbabwe when he is charged with murder. He seeks political asylum in the UK but is planning to make the equivalent of US$5,000 in London and fly back as he is sure that with that kind of money he can buy his way out of the criminal justice process. His struggle to raise the money sees him resorting to the low-paid jobs in the underbelly of London, but he also takes advantage of Shingi, his friend and squat-mate and blackmails his cousin's wife when he discovers that she's having an affair. The struggle intensifies as the narrator realises that he has to get back to Zimbabwe as soon as possible for a ceremonial ritual for his deceased mother. His mother's grave, in a rural village, may soon be destroyed by the Zimbabwean government which is evicting the villagers to roll in mining operations since valuable minerals have been discovered there. With events becoming increasingly fractious, the story comes to its denouement towards the end when the narrator's mind begins to unravel and, simultaneously, he and Shingi become a single entity.

Symbolism
Chikwava utilises the nameless narrator as a malignant presence in Shingi in order to articulate a duality of consciousness. The narrator is the ngozi, an avenging spirit in Shona culture, which normally afflicts one who has murdered an innocent person. It is essentially the dramatisation of trauma, resulting in what modern psychology calls dissociative identity disorder. In this way Chikwava explores the trauma suffered by young men who joined the militia in Zimbabwe and committed atrocities for their political masters. Throughout the story, the narrator and his friend, or host body, are tied together by a number of motifs, some of them ambivalent. These include
  the nameless narrator uses Shingi's ID to get jobs
  when looks into a fish pond, the reflection that stares back at him is that of Shingi
  the fact that the house where the narrator lives at first resembles Shingi's head and eventually becomes Shingi's head
  the nameless narrator continuously talks about possessing Shingi, both in the demonic sense and in the sense that Shingi gives him the money that he earns from his job
 AIDS is a common theme in the lives of both the narrator and Shingi
 Shingi's relatives, both in London and back in Zimbabwe, turn out to be the narrator's relatives
  the story concludes with the narrator and Shingi vying for the control of the body they share.

Awards and nominations
Harare North was longlisted for the 2010 Orwell Prize for political writing.

2009 novels
Novels set in London
2004 Zimbabwean novels